Ohrigstad River is located in Mpumalanga, South Africa. The Ohrigstad River joins the Blyde River at the Blyderivierpoort Dam in the Blyde River Canyon Nature Reserve. Like the Blyde, it has its ultimate origin at around 2,000 m altitude to the south, on the verge of the Hartebeesvlakte conservation area, but follows a more westerly course.

Dams in the River 
 Ohrigstad Dam

See also 
 List of rivers of South Africa
 List of reservoirs and dams in South Africa
 Blyde River Canyon

References

Rivers of Mpumalanga